Dance-punk (also known as disco-punk, punk-funk or techno-punk) is a post-punk subgenre that emerged in the late 1970s, and is closely associated with the disco, post-disco and new wave movements.

Predecessors 
Many groups in the post-punk era adopted a more danceable style. These bands were influenced by funk, disco, new wave, and other dance music popular at the time (as well as being anticipated by some artists from 1970s including Sparks and Iggy Pop). Influential bands from the 1980s included Talking Heads, Public Image Ltd., New Order, Gang of Four, Pigbag, the Clash, the Pop Group, Maximum Joy, Minutemen, and Red Hot Chili Peppers. New York City dance-punk included Defunkt, Material, James Chance and the Contortions, Cristina Monet, Bush Tetras, ESG, and Liquid Liquid. German punk singer Nina Hagen had an underground dance hit in 1983 with "New York / N.Y.", which mixed her searing punk (and opera) vocals with disco beats.

Contemporary dance-punk 
Although dance-punk faded with the rise of New wave music in the early 1980s, it made a comeback in the late 1990s and early 2000s as part of the post-punk revival. Dance-punk bands emerged from the pop-punk and garage rock revivals of the late 1990s. Well-known are acts such as LCD Soundsystem, Clinic, Death from Above 1979, !!!, Hockey, Liars, Franz Ferdinand, Hot Hot Heat, Foals, Yeah Yeah Yeahs, Bloc Party, Kasabian, You Say Party, the Faint, Arctic Monkeys, the Rapture, Shout Out Out Out Out, and Radio 4, joined by dance-oriented acts who adopted rock sounds such as Out Hud. In the early 2000s Washington, D.C. had a popular and notable punk-funk scene, inspired by Fugazi, post-punk, and go-go acts like Trouble Funk and Rare Essence, including bands like Q and Not U, Black Eyes, and Baltimore's Oxes, Double Dagger, and Dope Body. In Britain the combination of indie with dance-punk was dubbed new rave in publicity for Klaxons and the term was picked up and applied by the NME to bands including Trash Fashion, New Young Pony Club, Hadouken!, Late of the Pier, Test Icicles, and Shitdisco forming a scene with a similar visual aesthetic to earlier raves.

See also 
List of dance-punk artists
Art punk
Electropunk
Electronic rock

References

Bibliography 
Reynolds, Simon. "Mutant Disco and Punk-Funk: Crosstown Traffic in Early Eighties New York (and Beyond ...)." Rip It Up and Start Again: Post-punk 1978–84. London: Faber and Faber, Ltd., 2005.

 
Post-disco
Fusion music genres
American styles of music
English styles of music
British rock music genres